Neil Verhagen (born February 18, 2001) is a racing driver from the United States of America. Verhagen is the youngest to win the SCCA National Championship Runoffs, having accomplished this in the Formula F category.

Early career

Karting
Neil started indoor karting along with his brother Alex. The duo trained and raced at the Grand Prix New York facilities in Mount Kisco, New York, under the instruction of racing driver Stevan McAleer. McAleer raced many classes and won the 2015 Continental Tire Sports Car Challenge in the ST class. After racing at the Oakland Valley Race Park club scene, Verhagen joined the WKA and various Rotax Max racing series. In 2012 the young driver finished second in the Florida Winter Tour Minimax series. Verhagen beat many hopefuls such as Logan Sargeant, Patricio O'Ward and Trenton Estep.

To increase their sons chances at a successful racing career, the Verhagen family moved form Ridgefield, Connecticut, to Mooresville, North Carolina, in 2014. The family exchanged the WKA scene for the United States Pro Kart Series.

Lower formulae

Verhagen made his auto racing debut at Road Atlanta in the Skip Barber Winter Series. The young driver won the first three races of the championship at Road Atlanta and Sebring International Raceway. Verhagen, racing a Mazda powered Reynard chassis, finished second in the championship. Later in 2015 Verhagen debuted in the F1600 Championship Series. At the Pittsburgh International Race Complex Verhagen competed in a Spectrum. At the F2000 Championship Series finale at Pittsburgh Verhagen finished tenth in a RFR F2000.

For 2016 Verhagen joined K-Hill Motorsports in the F1600 Championship Series. The young driver won the championship beating teammate Peter Portante both racing Mygale SJ11 chassis. Verhagen also competed in the SCCA club racing scene. Winning the SCCA Majors Tour Northeast Conference Verhagen qualified for the SCCA National Championship Runoffs. Verhagen went on to become the youngest driver to win the Runoffs at 15 years and 242 days. Winning the Runoffs, Verhagen qualified for the 2016 Mazda Road to Indy Shootout.

Formula Renault 
In 2017, Verhagen was inducted into the Red Bull Junior Team and moved up to the Formula Renault Eurocup with MP Motorsport, alongside fellow Red Bull Junior Richard Verschoor. He had one podium at Hungaroring and finished the season eleventh, behind his Dutch teammate.

The following year, Verhagen returned to the Eurocup with Tech 1 Racing, where he finished the championship eleventh.

BRDC British F3 
In 2019, Verhagen lost his backing from Red Bull and moved to the BRDC British Formula 3 Championship with Double R Racing. He ended the season fifth overall, having taken seven podiums throughout the campaign.

Sportscar career

2020: Victorious GT debut 
Verhagen moved to sportscar racing in 2020, driving for Walkenhorst Motorsport as part of the BMW Junior Team in two rounds of the Nürburgring Endurance Series. This included the 24 Hours of Nürburgring, which the American won in the SP8T category driving a BMW M4 GT4.

2021: Nürburgring Endurance success 
For the 2021 season, Verhagen stepped up to the SP9 Pro class to partner Daniel Harper and Max Hesse in a full-time campaign of the Nürburgring Endurance Series, where the trio would compete in a BMW M6 GT3 car. Verhagen ended up second in the standings, having taken two victories.

2022: GT World Challenge 
The GT World Challenge Europe Endurance Cup would be Verhagen's destination in 2022, racing for the BMW Junior Team with ROWE Racing, once more alongside Harper and Hesse. After taking their first points in Imola with a fourth-placed finish, the trio ended up fifth in the 24 Hours of Spa, beating their teammates in the sister car. A further points finish at the Hockenheimring left the American eleventh in the championship, one place ahead of the more experienced line-up of the other Rowe Racing entry.

As a result of their accomplishments, Verhagen, Hesse and Harper were introduced as fully-fledged BMW works drivers before the 2023 season.

Racing record

Career summary

SCCA National Championship Runoffs

American Open-wheel racing results
(key) (Races in bold indicate pole position, races in italics indicate fastest race lap)

F1600 Championship Series

Complete Formula Renault Eurocup results
(key) (Races in bold indicate pole position) (Races in italics indicate fastest lap)

Complete BRDC British Formula 3 Championship results
(key) (Races in bold indicate pole position) (Races in italics indicate fastest lap)

Complete 24 Hours of Nürburgring results

Complete GT World Challenge Europe Endurance Cup results

*Season still in progress.

References

External links
 

2001 births
Living people
American people of Dutch descent
Racing drivers from Connecticut
World Karting Association drivers
Formula Ford drivers
SCCA National Championship Runoffs winners
Formula Renault Eurocup drivers
MRF Challenge Formula 2000 Championship drivers
Formula Renault 2.0 NEC drivers
BRDC British Formula 3 Championship drivers
MP Motorsport drivers
24H Series drivers
Nürburgring 24 Hours drivers
Tech 1 Racing drivers
Double R Racing drivers
BMW M drivers
Rowe Racing drivers
Michelin Pilot Challenge drivers